Antonio Maria Pacchioni (baptised 5 July 1654 - 15 July 1738) of Modena was a Baroque composer, known for his polyphonic church music. He studied violin technique with Giovanni Maria Bononcini and musical composition with Padre A. Bendinelli. He received holy orders in 1677, which enabled him to become maestro di cappella of the Duomo of Modena in 1694. His oratorios were among the first to be heard publicly in Modena (1677, 1678); of surviving compositions, two were on sacred subjects while a third (1682) concerned the quasi-legendary countess Matilda of Tuscany. His four-voice a cappella motets In monte Oliveti and Velum templi have been recorded.

Pacchioni also served as vice-maestro and then maestro di cappella at the ducal court of Rinaldo d'Este (1655–1737).

Among his pupils was the violinist-composer Tomaso Antonio Vitali.

Notes

Italian Baroque composers
Italian male classical composers
1654 births
1738 deaths
17th-century Italian composers
Musicians from Modena
18th-century Italian composers
18th-century Italian male musicians
17th-century male musicians